The Princeton Alumni Weekly (PAW) is a magazine published for the alumni of Princeton University. It was founded in 1900 and, until 1977, it was the only weekly college alumni magazine in the United States. Upon changing to biweekly publication in 1977, the number of issues per year decreased from twenty-eight to twenty-one, and then later decreased to seventeen. It remains the most frequently published alumni magazine in the world, currently publishing 14 times per year.

Notes

References

External links
Princeton Alumni Weekly Online

1900 establishments in New Jersey
Alumni magazines
Biweekly magazines published in the United States
Magazines established in 1900
Princeton University publications
Magazines published in New Jersey
Weekly magazines published in the United States